Stella Maris Football Club is an Irish association football club based in Drumcondra, Dublin. Founded in 1943, the club caters for over 350 children, ranging in age from 5 to 18 years. Some thirty coaches and managers train, organise and oversee the teams and academy run by the club. The club enters several teams in the Dublin & District Schoolboy League and the Leinster Senior League. Stella Maris is best known for its youth system which has successfully produced dozens of players who have gone on to play for clubs throughout Ireland and the United Kingdom. Many have also gone on to represent the Republic of Ireland at international level.

History

Moore and Whelan 
One of Stella Maris' earliest coaches was Paddy Moore. During the 1940s and early 1950s, when Moore coached Stella Maris, he nurtured the talents of future Republic of Ireland international Ronnie Whelan Sr. Whelan was initially "discovered" by Moore's wife, who then brought him to the attention of her husband. Whelan was one of the early success stories of the Stella Maris academy.

Milk Cup
Stella Maris have been regular participants in the Milk Cup, playing against the youth teams of among others, Feyenoord, Manchester United, Manchester City, Everton, Blackburn Rovers and Middlesbrough as well as national youth teams representing Wales, Estonia and Slovakia. On 27 July 1994, Glen Crowe scored a hat-trick as Stella Maris defeated Estonia 8–0 in a Milk Cup game.

Women's teams
Stella Maris has also fielded women's teams in both the Dublin Women's Soccer League and the FAI Women's Cup. Republic of Ireland women's internationals Stephanie Roche and Áine O'Gorman are both former Stella Maris players.

Home ground
In May 2014, Stella Maris opened a new clubhouse and a new 3G pitch at their base at Richmond Road. The facilities were officially opened by two former players, Johnny Giles and Eamon Dunphy, who were joined at the opening ceremony by Football Association of Ireland (FAI) chief John Delaney.
Stella Maris also play matches at a number of local pitches based at Clonturk Park and Albert College Park.

Notable former players

Republic of Ireland internationals

Republic of Ireland women's internationals
  Stephanie Roche
  Aine O'Gorman

Republic of Ireland B internationals
  Vinny Arkins
  Dessie Baker 
  Brian Mooney
  Richie Byrne

Republic of Ireland U23 international
  Brian Mooney

Republic of Ireland U21 internationals

League of Ireland XI representatives
  Vinny Arkins
  Kevin Brady
  Noel King
  Brian Mooney

Republic of Ireland managers
  Eoin Hand
  Johnny Giles
  Noel King
  Liam Tuohy
  Mick Cooke (football manager)

League of Ireland managers
  Roddy Collins
  Stephen Henderson
  Gary Cronin
  Mick Cooke

Actors
  Gabriel Byrne

Notable former managers
  Paddy Moore 1940s

Honours
FAI Youth Cup
Winners: 1973–74, 1993–94: 2
Runners-up: 1947–48, 1998–99: 2
FAI Under-17 Cup
Winners: 1982–83: 2
Runners-up: 1981–82, 1986–87, 1993–94: 2

Notes

References

 
Association football clubs in Dublin (city)
Leinster Senior League (association football) clubs
Association football academies in the Republic of Ireland
Association football clubs established in 1943
1943 establishments in Ireland
Women's association football clubs in the Republic of Ireland
Dublin Women's Soccer League teams